Peter Shaw ( Pullen; 24 June 1918 – 29 January 2003) was an English actor, producer and the second husband of actress Angela Lansbury.

Early life and career
Shaw was born on 24 June 1918 in Reading, Berkshire, England, and began his career in front of the screen following the Second World War, and later found success as a studio executive. Shaw served in the British Army during the Second World War. He was signed to a contract with Metro-Goldwyn-Mayer by the Charles Feldman Agency in the late 1940s. Shaw apprenticed with agent Paul Small, leading to an executive position at the studio and later a career with the William Morris Agency, where he represented Katharine Hepburn and Robert Mitchum, among others. He returned to MGM as assistant head of production in 1964 and then rejoined the William Morris Agency as an international business manager. Shaw launched Corymore Productions in 1987. He later produced Murder, She Wrote with his two sons at Universal Studios, starring his wife Angela Lansbury, in addition to other made-for-television features.

Personal life and death
After an early marriage that produced a son, David, he married actress Angela Lansbury in 1949; they had two children, Anthony Pullen Shaw (born 7 January 1952) and Deirdre Angela Shaw (born 26 April 1953). Peter Shaw died of heart failure in his Los Angeles home on 29 January 2003. He was 84.

Filmography

Acting

References

External links

 

English male film actors
1918 births
2003 deaths
English emigrants to the United States
People from Reading, Berkshire
20th-century English male actors
Male actors from Berkshire
British Army personnel of World War II
American television producers
Lansbury family
British expatriates in the United States
Military personnel from Berkshire